The  is a bus company in Urayasu, Chiba Prefecture. The company was established in 1976 by The Oriental Land Company. It is jointly owned by the Keisei Group and the Oriental Land Company. The company headquarters and bus depot is located in Chidori in Urayasu.

History
On 12 November 1976, the company was established as a wholly owned subsidiary of the Oriental Land Company and the Oriental Land Transport Co., Ltd.
On 1 April 1977 the company commenced operating route No.1 between Urayasu Station Iriguchi and Maihama Shako.
On 1 December 1988 the Keiyo Line was partially opened between Minami-Funabashi Station and Shin-Kiba Station. The company established new bus routes and bus stops at Maihama Station and Shin-Urayasu Station.
On 1 August 1989 the company was renamed Tokyo Bay City Koutsu following its acquisition by Keisei Electric Railway.
On 4 April 1996 the original Urayasu Terminal closed, replaced by Urayasu Station bus stop in front of Urayasu Station.

Office
 
Chidori office

Routes

Highway Buses

Route Buses
Maihama Station - Urayasu Station (Chiba)
Maihama Station - Shin-Urayasu Station
Maihama Station - Minami-Gyotoku Station
Shin-Urayasu Station - Minami-Gyotoku Station

See also 
Keisei Transit Bus
Keisei Bus
Kanto Railway
Kantetsu Green Bus
Kominato Railway

References

External links

 Tokyo Bay City Kotsu Official Website
 Outline in the Website
 about Highway bus
 Tourist information
 Official site in Oriental Land Company
 Bus information

Urayasu, Chiba
Japanese companies established in 1976
Transport in Chiba Prefecture
Bus companies of Japan